Lachnoanaerobaculum saburreum  is a bacterium from the genus of Lachnoanaerobaculum which has been isolated from human dental plaque.

References

Further reading

External links
Type strain of Lachnoanaerobaculum saburreum at BacDive -  the Bacterial Diversity Metadatabase

Lachnospiraceae
Bacteria described in 1966